The 9th IBF World Championships (World Badminton Championships) were held in Lausanne, Switzerland, between 22 May and 28 May 1995. Following the results of the women's singles.

Main stage

Section 1

Section 2

Section 3

Section 4

Section 5

Section 6

Section 7

Section 8

Final stage

External links
BWF Results

1995 IBF World Championships
IBF